Nicholas (died after 1134) was a Hungarian Catholic prelate in the 12th century, who served as Bishop of Nyitra (today Nitra, Slovakia) around 1134.

Nicholas was elected as bishop sometime after c. 1128, when his predecessor Gervasius is mentioned. Nicholas's episcopate is mentioned by a single source, a judgement letter of Felician, Archbishop of Esztergom from 1134. Accordingly, Nicholas acted as a judge of the archiepiscopal court in the lawsuit between Diocese of Zagreb and local noblemen regarding the right of ownership over the Dubrava forest.

References

Sources

 
 

12th-century Hungarian people
12th-century Roman Catholic bishops in Hungary
Bishops of Nitra